This is a list of police officers from the Royal Malaysia Police who were killed in the line of duty, based on official records from the year 1915 to date. Line of duty deaths refers to any police officer who died while carrying out the duty that they were obligated and/or authorised to carry out. This would include officers who responded to incidents while off-duty as obligated by the Police Force Act 1967, as well as those commuting to and from their place of duty or training.

Trends

Causes of death

Victims' Profile

The ethnic profile of police officers has been traditionally disproportionate compared to the national ethnic profile, with a significantly higher proportion of ethnic Malays, especially in the earlier decades. However, the number of casualties involving ethnic Malay police officers is statistically higher overall due in part to the high mortality rates involving the ethnic Malay community during the Malayan Emergency in the 1950-1970s, and in part to the ethnic composition of the police force.

Incidents by chronology
The following cases are listed by the date of death of the Malaysian police officer, although the incident attributing to death may have occurred earlier. The indicated ranks are at the time of death and do not include posthumous promotions. Ranks/service numbers are colour-coded based on the cause of death as per the following general classifications. Uncoded entries refer to cases whereby incident details are unknown or unclear:

Key
— denotes information is not available.

1910s

1940s

1950s

1960s

1970s

1980s

1990s

2000s

2010s

2020s

See also
 List of American police officers killed in the line of duty
 List of Australian Federal Police killed in the line of duty
 List of British police officers killed in the line of duty
 List of Gardaí killed in the line of duty
 List of New Zealand police officers killed in the line of duty
 List of Singapore police officers killed in the line of duty

References

External links
 Statistics of the Incident
 Royal Malaysian Police Force 

police
Lists of Malaysian people
Malaysia law-related lists

Royal Malaysia Police
Police officers killed in the line of duty